Nieuwland is a former municipality in the Dutch province of Zeeland. It existed until 1816, when it was merged with Sint Joosland to form the new municipality of Nieuw- en Sint Joosland.

Nieuwland is also the former name of the current village of Nieuw- en Sint Joosland.

References

Former municipalities of Zeeland